Derek Rivers (born May 9, 1994) is an American football defensive end for the Houston Texans of the National Football League (NFL). He played college football at Youngstown State.

Early years
Born in Augusta, Maine, Rivers and his family moved to North Carolina when he was five months old. Rivers later attended Kinston High School in Kinston. After high school, he attended Fork Union Military Academy for a year.

College career
Rivers played at Youngstown State from 2013 to 2016. During his career he had a school record 41 career sacks, including 14 as a senior. He accumulated 56.5 tackles for loss, 47 QB hurries and 119 solo tackles in his college career at Youngstown State. As a Senior, Rivers lead one of the top statistically rated defenses in the FCS to the National Championship where they would lose to James Madison University 24-14. Rivers was a three time 1st Team All-Missouri Valley Football Conference performer as well as a two time FCS All-American. Rivers finished his career #5 All-Time in FCS history in career sacks.

Professional career

New England Patriots
Rivers was drafted by the New England Patriots in the third round, 83rd overall, in the 2017 NFL Draft. During training camp, Rivers suffered a torn ACL and was ruled out for the season. He was officially placed on injured reserve on September 2, 2017. Rivers made his NFL debut in Week 3 of the  season, against the Detroit Lions. In week 17 he recorded his first career sack when he took down Sam Darnold. Rivers helped the Patriots reach Super Bowl LIII, although he was inactive, and the team defeated the Los Angeles Rams 13-3. The following season, Rivers suffered an injury in week 2 of the preseason, and was placed on injured reserve on August 31, 2019.

Rivers made the 53-man roster coming out of 's shortened preseason, and was active in week 1, where he recorded his first sack since 2018. He was placed on the reserve/COVID-19 list by the Patriots on October 17, 2020, and activated on October 21. On November 21, 2020, Rivers was waived by the Patriots.

Los Angeles Rams
On November 23, 2020, Rivers was claimed off waivers by the Los Angeles Rams.

Houston Texans
On March 23, 2021, Rivers signed with the Houston Texans. He was released on August 31, 2021 and re-signed to the practice squad. He was promoted to the active roster on November 24. On December 9, the Texans signed Rivers to a two-year, $1 million deal that runs through the 2022 season.

On August 30, 2022, Rivers was placed on injured reserve.

Rivers re-signed with the Texans on March 16, 2023.

References

External links
Youngstown State Penguins bio

Living people
1994 births
People from Kinston, North Carolina
Players of American football from North Carolina
American football defensive ends
American football linebackers
Youngstown State Penguins football players
New England Patriots players
Los Angeles Rams players
Houston Texans players